Bishop Union High School (BUHS) is a public high school in Bishop, California. It is part of the Bishop Unified School District. The school is located at 301 North Fowler Street.  The current principal is David Kalk. The superintendent is Barry Simpson. There are currently thirty-nine teachers at Bishop Union.  Classes at the school run from 8:15 am to 2:25 pm on Mondays and 8:15 am to 3:20 pm Tuesdays through Fridays. A bilingual program is offered through the guidance office. The 2011–2012 academic year began August 22, 2011 and ended with graduation day on June 8, 2012.

Bishop Union High School has a current enrollment of approximately 750 students. Enrollment figures in the late 1970s and into the 1990s hovered around 1,000 students. The nearby Union Carbide mine closure, coupled with the City of Los Angeles ownership of most of the land around Bishop, therefore controlling community development, caused Bishop schools to suffer a downturn in enrollment in the late 1990s and into the 2000s.

Athletics
The Bishop Union Broncos compete in the High Desert League of the CIF Central Section. Twelve different varsity sports are offered.

In the mid-1990s the Broncos competed in the Southern California Desert Inyo League, which then became the High Desert League.

For several decades, the Broncos competed with rival schools Paraclete (Lancaster, Calif.), Burroughs (Ridgecrest, Calif.) and Tehachapi (Tehachapi, Calif.) in sports. However, both Burroughs and Tehachapi grew larger than Bishop and moved on to larger divisions.

In 2010, the Broncos beat the Boron Bobcats 30–22 to win the CIF Southern Section Football Championship.

In 2013, the High Desert League moved from the CIF Southern Section, to the CIF Central Section.

In 2019, the Broncos beat Orosi, CA. 34–7 to win the CIF Central Section Division 6 Championship.  The Broncos advanced to the CIF State Bowl game for Division 6A, against Salesian College Preparatory (Richmond, CA.). Bishop Union High School lost the game 37–18.

References

External links
Bishop Union High School website
 MaxPreps Website http://www.maxpreps.com/high-schools/bishop-broncos-(bishop,ca)/home.htm

Public high schools in California
Bishop, California
Education in Inyo County, California